The Rifle 7.62mm 2A/2A1 (also known as the Ishapore 2A/2A1) is a 7.62×51mm NATO calibre bolt-action rifle adopted as a reserve arm by the Indian Armed Forces in 1963. The rifle is a variant of the Lee–Enfield rifle.   The design of the rifle – initially the Rifle 7.62mm 2A – began at the Rifle Factory Ishapore of the Ordnance Factories Board in India, soon after the Sino-Indian War of 1962.

The Ishapore 2A/2A1 has the distinction of being the last bolt-action rifle designed to be used by a regular military force other than specialized sniper rifles. While it is no longer in service with the Indian military, the rifle is still used by the Indian police.

History
The 2A was widely used by the Indian Army after the Sino-Indian War in 1962, despite the use of the SLR after 1965. 2A rifles were previously supplied to Bangladesh during the Bangladesh Liberation War.

The weapon was produced at a rate between 22,000 and 115,000 rifles annually, averaging 70,000 a year. Around 250,000 rifles were made in total before production ended in 1974.

Development
Production of the 2A/2A1 started in 1962 after the SMLE Mk IIIs* was phased out of service with the Indian military. The Indian-made SMLE Mk IIIs are known as the Type 56, made between 1956 and 1965 although any rifles made in the latter are rare due to the transition to the 2A.

Externally, the Ishapore 2A/2A1 rifle is based upon (and is almost identical to) the .303 British calibre SMLE Mk III* rifle, with the exception of the distinctive "square" (10 or 12 round) magazine and the use of the buttplate from the 1A (Indian version of the FN FAL) rifle. The bolt and receiver were made out of nickel.

The 2A was designed to allow the British Pattern 1907 (P'07) sword bayonet used on the SMLE MkIII to be attached. Other difference included the use of improved steel (to handle the increased pressures of the 7.62mm NATO round), and a redesigned extractor to cope with the rimless round. 

The original (2A) design incorporated the Lee–Enfield rear sight which has graduations out to 2000 yards. The re-designated "Rifle 7.62mm 2A1" incorporated a more realistic 800 meter rear sight in 1965. The stock is recycled from the No. 1 Mk. III armory stock, with the addition of a cross screw forward of the magazine well. 

Some stocks were salvaged from existing surplus and show artificer repairs where rotted or damaged wood has been replaced. This repair is especially evident with the recoil draws (the area the receiver contacts when recoiling after the shot) that often failed over time due to the rifle being rack-stored butt down / muzzle up, which allowed oils and grease to migrate downwards into this critical area.

Variants

Ishapore 2A rifle
The original production rifle has a sight range of 2000 meters.

Ishapore 2A1 rifle
A second production variant with a sight range of 800 meters.

IOF .315 sporting rifle

No. 7 Jungle Carbine
There are 2A1 rifles converted to No. 7 Jungle Carbines, which are mostly commercial-based, made by navy arms.

References

Bibliography

 
 
 

7.62×51mm NATO rifles
Bolt-action rifles of India
Military equipment introduced in the 1960s